Three ships in the United States Navy have been named for Rear Admiral Henry A. Walke.

United States Navy ship names